Welterwerk is the first full-length album by Norwegian extreme metal band Drottnar, released on Endtime Productions in 2006.

Recording
Welterwerk was recorded at Subsonic Studios, Norway, in 2005, and it was produced by Lars Klokkerhaug and Drottnar.

Musically Welterwerk is technical and progressive extreme metal with elements from death and black metal styles. Welterwerk is characterized by experimental, technical guitar playing and plenty of tempo changes.

The concept of the album can be described as militant, as it introduces vocal effects such as megaphone, Czech speaking vocals, and instruments such as trumpet and mandolin. "Victor Comrade", "Niemand Geht Vorbei" and "Vulgo Vesper" are instrumental pieces that concentrate on creating the album's atmosphere with the aforementioned elements as well as samples reminiscent of war time radio communication. The album's concept is supported by the booklet's pictures of old industrial machinery and the band's members in military uniforms reminiscent of those of Soviet, Czech or DDR style. "Rullett" is sung in Norwegian. Welterwerk lyrics have a political vibe, containing Latin phrases such as ad hoc and sine qua non. "Niemand Geht Vorbei" is German for "None Shall Pass".

The album's reception was positive and it achieved good reviews from magazines such as Terrorizer.

Track listing
"Ad Hoc Revolt" – 5:52
"The Kakistocracy Catacombs" – 8:52
"Autonomic Self-Schism" – 5:29
"Niemand Geht Vorbei" – 2:12
"Victor Comrade" – 4:15
"Stardom in Darkness" – 6:08
"Rullett" – 5:20
"Destruction's Czar" – 8:03
"Vulgo Vesper" – 5:54

Singles
"Ad Hoc Revolt" (10:07), 2006 Endtime ProductionsA 7-inch vinyl record single, published  as a limited 100 copies edition teaser before the album's release. The record contains the songs "Ad Hoc Revolt" and "Victor Comrade", also found in the Welterwerk album. "Ad Hoc Revolt" begins with a sample of an old film projector starting up, and then features the band's technical and progressive extreme metal output. "Victor Comrade" is an instrumental piece, containing mostly trumpet playing by session musician Jan-Espen S. Schildmann and Czech speaking vocals of Ondřej Valeš.
"Ad Hoc Revolt" (5:52)
"Victor Comrade" (4:15)

Personnel
Sven-Erik Lind – vocals
Karl Fredrik Lind – guitar
Bengt Olsson – guitar
Håvar Wormdahl – bass guitar
Glenn-David Lind – drums

Guest musicians
Jan-Espen S. Schildmann – trumpet on "Victor Comrade" and "Autonomic Self-Schism"
Ondřej "Walcha" Valeš – Czech speaking vocals on "Victor Comrade" and "Vulgo Vesper"

Others
Lars Klokkerhaug – producer
Durling – art direction

References

Drottnar albums
2006 debut albums
Technical death metal albums